Sudhanthira Naattin Adimaigal is a 1988 Indian Tamil-language vigilante film directed by S. A. Chandrasekhar, starring Charan Raj and Raadhika. It was released on 26 February 1988. The film was remade in Hindi as Azaad Desh Ke Gulam (1990).

Plot

Cast 
 Charan Raj
 Raadhika
 Charuhasan
 Nizhalgal Ravi
 Ravichandran
 S. S. Chandran
 Senthamarai
 Senthil
 A. Sakunthala
 Srividya

Soundtrack 
The music was composed by M. S. Viswanathan.

Release and reception 
Sudhanthira Naattin Adimaigal was released on 26 February 1988. The film faced trouble with the censor board, resulting in a scene being censored. Jayamanmadhan of Kalki felt it would be a catalyst for corrupt politicians disappearing from Tamil cinema soon.

References

External links 

1980s Tamil-language films
1980s vigilante films
Censored films
Films directed by S. A. Chandrasekhar
Films scored by M. S. Viswanathan
Indian vigilante films
Tamil films remade in other languages